This article is a general overview of divorce laws around the world. Every nation in the world allows its residents to divorce under some conditions except the Philippines (though Muslims in the Philippines have the right to divorce) and the Vatican City, an ecclesiastical sovereign city-state, which has no procedure for divorce. In these two countries, laws only allow annulment of marriages.

Summary table

Muslim societies 

In the  Muslim world, legislation concerning divorce varies from country to country. Different Muslim scholars can have slightly differing interpretations of divorce in Islam.

No-fault divorce is allowed in Muslim societies, although normally only with the consent of the husband (talaq). If the wife wants to divorce (khul'), she must go to a court, providing evidence of her husband's ill-treatment, his inability to sustain her financially, his sexual impotence, or her dislike of his looks. The husband may be given time to fix the problem, but if he fails, the judge will grant the divorce.

Argentina
In Argentina, the legalisation of divorce was the result of a struggle between different governments and conservative groups, mostly connected to the Catholic Church.

In 1888, Law 2,393 established that marriage and divorce in Argentina would be controlled by the State, not the Church. The law allowed for separation of the spouses by judicial order on the grounds of adultery, insults, violence, or desertion, but did not allow for dissolution of marriage.

Only in 1954, President Juan Domingo Perón had Law 14,394 passed over the objections of the Catholic Church. For the first time in the country, marriages could be ended and divorcees could remarry. But Perón was forced out of the presidency one year later by a military coup, and the government that succeeded him abolished the law.

From 1968 onwards, couples could legally separate without proving fault, but marriages still could not be dissolved.

Finally, in 1987, President Raúl Alfonsín was successful in passing the divorce law (Law 23,515), following a ruling of the Supreme Court. The new law also provided for gender equality between the wife and husband.

A new Civil and Commercial Code, modernizing family law and simplifying divorce, came into force in August 2015.

Australia

Australia's laws on divorce and other legal family matters were overhauled in 1975 with the enactment of the Family Law Act 1975, which established no-fault divorce in Australia. Since 1975, the only ground for divorce is the irretrievable breakdown of the marriage, evidenced by a twelve-month separation. However, a residual "fault" element remains in relation to child custody and property settlement issues.

Belgium
See Divorce in Belgium

Brazil
Presumably, due to the influence of the Roman Catholic Church, divorce became legal in Brazil only in 1977. Since January 2007, Brazilian couples can request a divorce at a notary's office if they have no disputed property and  no minor or special-needs children. The couple need only present their national IDs and marriage certificate, and pay a fee to initiate the process, which is completed in two or three weeks. However, as is common in other areas of interaction with the government in Brazil, an expert agent (despachante), expedites the process, and finalization of the documents by a lawyer is required.

The 66th amendment to Brazil's Constitution, passed in 2010, removed the prior requirement of one year's separation before a divorce could take place.

Bulgaria
In Bulgaria, a new Family Code came into effect in 2009, modernizing family law. Divorce can be obtained by two means:
 by mutual consent. (Article 50) In this case, both spouses agree to divorce; and the court admits the divorce without searching for the reasons for it 
 at the request of either spouse if  "the matrimony is deeply and irretrievably dissolved". (Article 49) The court only pronounces itself on the 'fault' of the spouse(s) if this has been specifically requested by one of the spouses.

Canada 
Canada did not have a federal divorce law until 1968. Before that time, the process of getting a divorce varied from province to province. In Newfoundland and Quebec, it was necessary to get a private Act of Parliament to end a marriage. Most other provinces incorporated the English "Matrimonial Causes Act" of 1857 which allowed a husband to get a divorce on the grounds of his wife's adultery, and a wife to get one only if she established that her husband committed adultery and another listed behavior, but not simply adultery. This rule applied in those provinces that had adopted the English Act. In 1925, Parliament provided that in those provinces, a wife could sue on grounds of adultery alone.

In Ontario, divorce was not permitted until 1930.

The federal Divorce Act of 1968 standardized the law of divorce across Canada and introduced the no-fault concept of permanent marriage breakdown as a ground for divorce as well as fault-based grounds including adultery, cruelty and desertion. In 1986, Parliament replaced the Act, which simplified the law of divorce further.

In Canada, while civil and political rights are in the jurisdiction of the provinces, the Constitution of Canada specifically made marriage and divorce the realm of the federal government. Essentially this means that Canada's divorce law is uniform throughout Canada, even in Quebec, which differs from the other provinces in its use of the civil law as codified in the Civil Code of Quebec as opposed to the common law that is in force in the other provinces and generally interpreted in similar ways throughout the Anglo-Canadian provinces. The law for division of property and debt, however, is within the jurisdiction of each province or territory, creating a structure where both provincial and federal laws will apply in the majority of divorce claims.

The Canada Divorce Act recognizes divorce only on the ground of breakdown of the marriage. The breakdown can only be established if one of three grounds hold: adultery, cruelty, and being separated for one year. Most divorces proceed based on the spouses being separated for one year, even if there has been cruelty or adultery.

The one-year period of separation starts from the time at least one spouse intends to live separate and apart from the other and acts on it. A couple does not need a court order to be separated, since there is no such thing as a "legal separation" in Canada.

A couple can even be considered to be "separated" even if they are living in the same dwelling. Either spouse can apply for a divorce in the province in which either the husband or wife has lived for at least one year.

On September 13, 2004, the Ontario Court of Appeal declared a portion of the Divorce Act also unconstitutional for excluding same-sex marriages, which at the time of the decision were recognized in three provinces and one territory. It ordered same-sex marriages read into that act, permitting the plaintiffs, a lesbian couple, to divorce.

British Columbia 
While the overall law is standard at the federal level, each province has its own act determining the rules for the division of property and debt, as well as its own procedure for obtaining an order through the courts. In British Columbia, the Family Law Act covers the division of property and debt between divorcing spouses. The rules of the Supreme Court of British Columbia provide for contested procedures, where parties do not agree on terms, and for uncontested divorces (also called desk order divorces) through streamlined procedures designed for spouses who agree on the terms for divorce orders and other relief. To get a divorce order, the court must be satisfied that:

the marriage legally exists,
at least one of the parties has been ordinarily resident in British Columbia for at least one year before the proceeding began,
the ground on which marriage breakdown in claimed has been proven, and,
if there are children, an adequate amount of child support is being paid.

Alberta 

In Alberta, The Family Law Act gives clear guidelines to family members, lawyers and judges about the rights and responsibilities of family members. It does not cover divorce, and matters involving family property, and child protection matters. The Family Law Act replaces the Domestic Relations Act, the Maintenance Order Act, the Parentage and Maintenance Act, and parts of the Provincial Court Act and the Child, Youth and Family Enhancement Act.

The Family Law Act can be viewed and printed from the Alberta Queen's Printer website.

One goes to the Court of Queen's Bench of Alberta to obtain a declaration of parentage for all purposes if someone has the property to be divided or protected court and or for a declaration of irreconcilability.

Separation
There is no such thing as legal separation in Canada. Sometimes, when people say they are legally separated, they mean that they have entered into a legally binding agreement, sometimes called a Separation Agreement, a Divorce Agreement, a Custody, Access and Property Agreement, or a Minutes of Settlement. These types of agreements are usually prepared by lawyers, signed in front of witnesses, and legal advice is given to both parties signing the agreement. However, these types of agreements will, in most cases, be upheld by the courts.

Chile 
Chile legalized divorce in 2004, overturning an 1884 legal code. The law that legalized divorce is called the Nueva Ley de Matrimonio Civil ("New Civil Marriage Law"), and was first introduced as a bill in 1995; there had been previous divorce bills before, but this one managed to secure enough conservative and liberal support to pass. Under the new law, couples must be separated for a year before divorcing if the split is mutual, and three years if the split is not mutual.

The four marital statuses that exist within Chile are married, separated, divorced, and widow(er). Only the divorced and widow(er) statuses allow a new marriage. Before the legalization of divorce, the only way to leave a marriage was to obtain a civil annulment, and annulments were only granted by telling the civil registrar that the spouse had lied in some way concerning the marriage license, thereby voiding the marriage contract.

China 
In China, divorce law is the fourth chapter of Marriage Law which has been firstly passed since 1950. Divorce could not be sought by women before the law. The law ensures the freedom of marriage (to marry and to divorce) and prevents others' interference.

Generally speaking, there are two methods to ask for a divorce:

 If a couple is willing to divorce, they can go to the government office of civil affairs for divorce registration. The agency will issue a divorce certificate when it ensures that both spouses are indeed voluntary and have properly dealt with the children and property issues.
 If only one of the two spouses requests the divorce, the spouse can accept mediation from the relevant department or sue for a divorce. In most cases, the court would offer mediation before the trial; if the relationship has indeed broken and the mediation is invalid, the court would grant the request. In any of the following circumstances, then divorce should also be granted: (1) bigamy (2) domestic violence or abuse, or abandonment of family members (3) long-term gambling, drug, etc. (4) separation for more than two years (5) other factors that might break the relationship.

The arrangement of children and property is based on the consent of two parties. However, the relationship between children and parents is not broken down by the divorce, which means both parents have the right and obligation to raise and educate the children.

One special characteristic of divorce in China is the process of mediation. This justice process is influenced by both Western modernism and Chinese tradition. Mediated reconciliation is an important process in Chinese justice systems. Before 1990, courts dealt with 80% of civil cases through mediation instead of adjudication. However, in recent research, it turns out the courts have shifted from mediation to adjudication as handling divorce cases after reforms of the Chinese judiciary in the 1990s, and more effective and systematical approach has been restricted by Marriage Law. Additionally, divorce reform strictly defined domestic violence and expanded forms of matrimonial assets. These substantially protect the property rights of women after divorce and empower women in the family, which is also shown by a less skewed child sex ratio.

Czech Republic 
The Czech Civil Code (No. 89/2012 Coll.) provides for two types of divorce: amicable and contentious. An amicable divorce is done by a court judgement that approves a divorce agreement between the parties. Several preconditions must be met: the marriage must have lasted for at least a year and the couple does not form a family unit for at least six months. The parties need to reach also agreement on post-divorce child care, division of common property, housing and possibly alimony. The contentious divorce takes place when the parties cannot reach an agreement. If there are underage children, the court may divorce the marriage only after first deciding on future care for the children.

France 
The French Civil code (modified on January 1, 2005), permits divorce for 4 different reasons; mutual consent; acceptance; separation of one year; and due to the 'fault' of one partner.
The first French divorce law was passed on 20 September 1792, during the French Revolution. It was subsequently modified in 1793 and 1794, and eventually incorporated in the Civil code It was repealed on 8 May 1816, at the instigation mainly of the Catholic church, after the restoration of the Bourbon kings. Divorce was reestablished by law on 27 July 1884.

Greece
In Greece, marriage and divorce regulations have undergone major changes in 1982 and 1983, when civil marriage was introduced; and the family law was modified to ensure gender equality.

Divorce in Greece can be obtained on several grounds:
 divorce by mutual consent (both spouses must agree)
 divorce on the ground that the marriage has been strongly impaired due to reasons that can be imputed either to the defendant or both spouses, making the continuation of the marriage unbearable for the petitioner
 divorce on the ground of separation of 2 years (Article 14 of Law 3719/2008 reduced the separation period from 4 years to 2 years)

India

In the Hindu religion, marriage is a sacrament and not a contract, hence divorce was not recognized before the codification of the Hindu Marriage Act in 1955. With the codification of this law, men and women both are equally eligible to seek divorce. Hindus, Buddhists, Sikhs, and Jains are governed by the Hindu Marriage Act 1955, Christians are governed by The Divorce Act 1869, Parsis by the Parsi Marriage and Divorce Act 1936, Muslims by the Dissolution of Muslim Marriages Act, 1939 and Inter-religious marriages are governed by The Special Marriage Act 1954.

Conditions are laid down to perform a marriage between a man and a woman by these laws. Based on these a marriage is validated, if not it is termed as void marriage or voidable marriage at the option of either of the spouses. Hereupon filing a petition by anyone spouse before the Court of law a decree of nullity is passed declaring the marriage as null and void.

A valid marriage can be dissolved by a decree of dissolution of marriage or divorce and Hindu Marriage Act, The Divorce Act and Special Marriage Act allow such a decree only on specific grounds as provided in these acts: cruelty, adultery, desertion, apostasy from Hinduism, impotency, venereal disease, leprosy, joining a religious order, not heard of being alive for a period of seven years, or mutual consent where no reason has to be given. Since each case is different, court interpretations of the statutory law get evolved and have either narrowed or widened their scope.

Family Courts are established to file, hear and dispose of such cases.

Ireland
Under the Constitution of Ireland adopted in 1937, there had been a bar on any law providing for the dissolution of marriage. An amendment to allow divorce under specified circumstances was rejected with 63.5% against in a referendum in 1986. However, in 1995, a second amendment was approved by referendum with 50.3% in favour to allow divorce in circumstances where a couple had been separated for four out of the preceding five years, and proper provision is made for both spouses and any children. Divorce law is governed by the Family Law (Divorce) Act 1996. This law was later amended in 2019 by a further third amendment and the subsequent Family Law Act 2019. It is possible to be considered separated while living under the same roof.

Divorces obtained outside Ireland are only recognised by the State if either:
 at least one of the spouses was domiciled within the jurisdiction which issued the decree of divorce at the time of issue, or
 the state is required to recognise the divorce according to the relevant European Union regulations — currently Council Regulation (EC) No 2201/2003 concerning jurisdiction and the recognition and enforcement of judgments in matrimonial matters and the matters of parental responsibility.
Following a national referendum held on 24 May 2019 on amending Ireland's restrictive divorce laws (in force since 1995), the four-year waiting time for a divorce was removed from the constitution by a c.82% majority of voters. The legislature will be thus enabled to write into Irish law a much-reduced waiting period required to obtain a divorce. 
Following the same referendum legislators will also be enabled to write into Irish law an easing of restrictions in recognising divorces obtained in other jurisdictions
In October 2019, Irish President Michael D. Higgins signed into law the Family Law Act 2019 which amended the 1996 Divorce Act by shortening the period of separation from four years to two years and reduced the waiting period, which occurs after the divorce is filed, from five years to three years. This Act became effective on 1 December 2019.

Italy 
Divorce was introduced in Italy by the law of 1 December 1970 (amended several times until 2015). An abrogative  referendum supported by Catholic organizations and by the Vatican was defeated on 12 May 1974. A constitutional issue had been also raised about Italy's obligations under the Lateran Treaty, entered into in 1929, on whether it prohibited Italy from authorizing divorce. Before 1970, there was no provision for divorce in Italian law, and the difficulty of ridding oneself of an unwanted spouse in the absence of any legal way to do so was a frequent topic of drama and humour, reaching its apotheosis in the 1961 film Divorce, Italian Style.

In Italy, almost all divorces are granted on the ground of legal separation. Since 2015, the period of legal separation necessary for divorce is one year in the cases of contested separation and six months in the cases of consensual separation (previously, five years since 1970 and three years since 1987), since the comparison of the spouses at the first hearing in the separation procedure or since the date of the separation agreement. A separation decree may be granted when there are facts that would render the continuation of married life intolerable or have a serious and damaging impact on the upbringing of the children. Separation may also be granted by mutual consent. Separation by mutual consent and uncontested divorce are also possible without judicial procedure.

Divorce may be granted without a previous legal separation only in very rare cases (e.g. final criminal conviction, annulment or divorce obtained abroad by the foreign spouse, unconsummated marriage, sex change).

Japan 
In Japan, there are four types of divorce: Divorce by Mutual Consent, Divorce by Family Court Mediation, Divorce by Family court Judgement, and Divorce by District Court Judgment.

Divorce by mutual consent is a simple process of submitting a declaration to the relevant government office that says both spouses agree to divorce. This form is often called the "Green Form" due to the wide green band across the top. If both parties fail to reach an agreement on conditions of a Divorce By Mutual Consent, such as child custody which must be specified on the divorce form, then they must use one of the other three types of divorce. Foreign divorces may also be registered in Japan by bringing the appropriate court documents to the local city hall along with a copy of the Family Registration of the Japanese ex-spouse. If an international divorce includes joint custody of the children, it is important to the foreign parent to register it, because joint custody is not legal in Japan. The parent to register the divorce may thus be granted sole custody of the child according to Japanese law.

Divorce by Mutual Consent in Japan differs from divorce in many other countries, causing it to not be recognized by all countries. It does not require the oversight by courts intended in many countries to ensure an equitable dissolution to both parties. Further, it is not always possible to verify the identity of the non-Japanese spouse in the case of an international divorce. This is due to two facts. First, both spouses do not have to be present when submitting the divorce form to the government office. Second, a Japanese citizen must authorize the divorce form using a personal stamp (Hanko), and Japan has a legal mechanism for the registration of personal stamps. On the other hand, a non-Japanese citizen can authorize the divorce form with a signature. But there is no such legal registry for signatures, making forgery of the signature of a non-Japanese spouse difficult to prevent at best, and impossible to prevent without foresight. The only defence against such forgery is, before the forgery occurs, to submit another form to prevent a divorce form from being legally accepted by the government office at all. This form must be renewed every six months.

Malta
Despite civil marriage being introduced in 1975, no provision was made for divorce except for the recognition of divorces granted by foreign courts. Legislation introducing divorce came into effect in October 2011 following the result of a referendum on the subject earlier in the year. It provides for no-fault divorce, with the marriage being dissolved through a Court judgement following the request of one of the parties, provided the couple has lived apart for at least four years out of the previous five and adequate alimony is being paid or is guaranteed. The same law made several important changes regarding alimony, notably through extending it to children born of marriage who are still in full-time education or are disabled and through protecting alimony even after the Court pronounces a divorce.

New Zealand

The Family Proceedings Act 1980 came into effect on 1 October 1981 and transferred jurisdiction for divorce proceedings from the High Court to the newly created Family Court. From that date, the term used was no longer divorce but the dissolution of marriage or civil union.  Application is made to the Family Court for dissolution on the grounds that the marriage or civil union has broken down irreconcilably and the spouses have been separated for two years or more. The application may be made jointly or by either party.

Norway

Philippines
Philippine law does not provide for divorce inside the country since 1954, and it remains the only UN member state without legal provision for divorce.  The only exception is concerning Muslims, who are allowed to divorce in certain circumstances according to their religion. For the majority of non-Muslims, the law only allows for annulment of marriages.

The Civil Code of the Philippines asserts that it is binding upon citizens of the Philippines, even if living abroad.  If a legally married Filipino citizen obtains a divorce outside of the Philippines, that divorce would not be recognised inside the Philippines.  This can lead to complications when Filipinos divorce outside the Philippines.

Where a non-Filipino is married to a Filipino citizen and a divorce is obtained abroad by the non-Filipino spouse, the Filipino spouse can remarry under Philippine law, even if the non-Filipino spouse acquired foreign citizenship after the marriage.

The process of annulment is a complex and expensive one, costing around ₱150,000–200,000 ( US$2,800–3,700 or €2,400–3,200), which is about an average net annual salary in the Philippines.

According to a survey conducted in 2017 by the Social Weather Stations (SWS), 53% of Filipinos agreed legalizing divorce, while 32% support outlawing it.

Over the years, many bills have been proposed to allow divorce, for example, those by Risa Hontiveros, but none has passed both houses of Congress; most have never even received a floor vote. Former President Rodrigo Duterte is against divorce. After the 2019 Philippine elections, his party's comfortable majority appeared to ensure that divorce would not be on the agenda of the 18th Congress. However, in February 2020, a House of Representatives panel approved the Absolute Divorce Bill of 2019 (House Bill No. 100), written by Representative Edcel Lagman.

During the 2022 presidential campaign, Bongbong Marcos (who was subsequently elected) expressed reserved support for legalising divorce but cautioned against making it too "easy".

Poland

Portugal
Portugal's divorce laws were modified in October 2008, liberalizing the process. Divorce may be obtained either by mutual consent; or, at the request of one spouse, if any of the following grounds exist: 1) separation for one year; 2) Any change in the mental faculties of the other spouse when this has lasted for more than a year because of its seriousness, it compromises the possibility of a life together; 3) Absence of one spouse without any news for a period of more than a year;
4) Any other facts that reveal a definitive breakdown of the marriage (e.g. domestic violence). The new 2008 law abolished the legal concept of 'fault' (divórcio-sanção).

Portugal allows two persons to lodge an electronic divorce, to file an electronic request for no-fault collaborative divorce in a non judiciary administrative entity. In specific cases, with no children, real property, alimony, or common address, can be decree as summary within one hour.

South Africa 
The law of divorce in South Africa is codified in the Divorce Act, 1979. The law provides for no-fault divorce based on the irretrievable breakdown of the marital relationship. The courts may accept any relevant evidence, but the law specifically mentions one year's separation, adultery, and habitual criminality as factors that may prove irretrievable breakdown. A divorce may also be obtained on the grounds of incurable mental illness for two years or continuous unconsciousness for six months.

Divorce cases are heard in the High Courts or, since 2010, in the regional civil magistrates' courts. A court has the jurisdiction to hear a divorce if either of the spouses is legally domiciled within the geographical jurisdiction of the court, or if either spouse is "ordinarily resident" (i.e. normally lives in) the jurisdiction and has been ordinarily resident in South Africa for at least a year.

Divorce of same-sex couples is subject to the same law as the divorce of opposite-sex couples. Divorce for marriages under customary law is also subject to the civil law, with certain modifications to account for the fact that customary marriages may be polygynous.

Should the divorcees have children, it is necessary to compile a parenting plan which must be signed off by the family advocate.

Sweden 

To divorce, in Sweden, the couple can file for divorce together or one party can file alone. If they have children under 16 living at home or one party does not wish to get divorced there is a required contemplation period of 6 to 12 months. During this period, they stay married and the request must be confirmed after the waiting period for the divorce to go through.

United Kingdom

England and Wales

Scotland

United States 

Divorce in the United States is a matter of state rather than federal law. In recent years, however, more federal legislation has been enacted affecting the rights and responsibilities of divorcing spouses. The laws of the state(s) of residence at the time of divorce govern; all states recognize divorces granted by any other state through the principle of comity, enshrined in Article IV of the U.S. Constitution. All states impose a minimum time of residence in the state. Typically, a county court's family division judges petitions for the dissolution of marriages.

Before the latter decades of the 20th century, a spouse seeking divorce had to show cause and even then might not be able to obtain a divorce. The legalization of no-fault divorce in the United States began in 1969 in California, under legislation signed by then-Governor Ronald Reagan and was completed in 2010, with New York being the last of the fifty states to legalize it. However, some states still require some waiting period before a divorce, typically a 1– to 2–year separation. Fault grounds, when available, are sometimes still sought. This may be done where it reduces the waiting period otherwise required, or possibly in hopes of affecting decisions related to a divorce, such as a child custody, child support, division of marital assets, or alimony. Since the mid-1990s, a few states have enacted covenant marriage laws, which allow couples to voluntarily make a divorce more difficult for themselves to obtain than in the typical no-fault divorce action.

Mediation is a growing way of resolving divorce issues. It tends to be less adversarial (particularly important for any children), more private, less expensive, and faster than traditional litigation. Similar in concept, but with more support than mediation, is collaborative divorce, where both sides are represented by attorneys but commit to negotiating a settlement without engaging in litigation. Some believe that mediation may not be appropriate for all relationships, especially those that included physical or emotional abuse, or an imbalance of power and knowledge about the parties' finances.

States vary in their rules for the division of assets. Some states are "community property" states, others are "equitable distribution" states, and others have elements of both. Most "community property" states start with the presumption that community assets will be divided equally, whereas "equitable distribution" states presume fairness may dictate more or less than half of the assets will be awarded to one spouse or the other. Commonly, assets acquired before marriage are considered the property of the individual and not marital property. and assets acquired after, marital. An attempt is made to assure the welfare of any minor children generally through their dependency. Alimony, also known as "maintenance" or "spousal support", is still being granted in many cases, especially in longer-term marriages.

A decree of divorce will generally not be granted until all questions regarding child care and custody, division of property and assets, and ongoing financial support are resolved.

Due to the complex or onerous divorce requirements in many places, some people seek divorces from other jurisdictions that have easier and faster processes. Most of these places are commonly referred to negatively as "divorce mills." Reno, Nevada was for many years the iconic example of a US divorce mill.

Where people from different countries get married, and one or both then choose to reside in another country, the procedures for divorce can become significantly more complicated. Although most countries make divorce possible, the form of settlement or agreement following divorce may be very different depending on where the divorce takes place.

In some countries, there may be a bias towards the man regarding property settlements, and in others, there may be a bias towards the woman concerning property and custody of any children. One or both parties may seek to divorce in a country that has jurisdiction over them. Normally there will be a residence requirement in the country in which the divorce takes place. See also Divorces obtained by US couples in a different country or jurisdiction above for more information, as applicable globally. In the case of disputed custody, almost all lawyers would strongly advise following the jurisdiction applicable to the dispute, i.e. the country or state of the spouse's residence. Even if not disputed, the spouse could later dispute it and potentially invalidate another jurisdiction's ruling.

Some of the more important aspects of divorce law involve the provisions for any children involved in the marriage, and problems may arise due to abduction of children by one parent, or restriction of contact rights to children. For the conflict of Laws issues, see divorce (conflict).

Courts in the United States currently recognize two types of divorce: absolute divorce, known as "divorce a vinculo matrimonii", and limited divorce, known as "divorce a menso et thoro".

References

Further reading
 Amato, Paul R. and Alan Booth. A Generation at Risk: Growing Up in an Era of Family Upheaval. Reviews and information at 
 Gallagher, Maggie. The Abolition of Marriage (Regnery Publishing, 1996) .
 Lester, David. "Time-Series Versus Regional Correlates of Rates of Personal Violence." Death Studies 1993: 529–534.
 McLanahan, Sara and Gary Sandefur. Growing Up with a Single Parent; What Hurts, What Helps. (Cambridge: Harvard University Press, 1994: 82)
 Morowitz, Harold J. Hiding in the Hammond Report (Hospital Practice. August 1975; 39)
 Stansbury, Carlton D. and Kate A. Neugent Is the Haugan decision functionally obsolete? (Wisconsin Law Journal. February 18, 2008)
 Office for National Statistics (UK). Mortality Statistics: Childhood, Infant and Perinatal Review of the Registrar General on Deaths in England and Wales, 2000, Series DH3 33, 2002.
 U.S. Bureau of the Census. Marriage and Divorce. General US survey information. 
 U.S. Department of Health and Human Services. Survey of Divorce  (link obsolete).